The 1998 Winston 500 was the 29th stock car race of the 1998 NASCAR Winston Cup Series season, the last of five races of that year's Winston No Bull 5, and the 29th iteration of the event. The race was held on Sunday, October 11, 1998, in Lincoln, Alabama at Talladega Superspeedway, a 2.66 miles (4.28 km) permanent triangle-shaped superspeedway. The race took the scheduled 188 laps to complete. In the last 13 laps of the race, Robert Yates Racing driver Dale Jarrett would manage to defend the field to take his 18th career NASCAR Winston Cup Series victory, his third and final victory of the season, and a US$1,000,000 (adjusted for inflation, US$) bonus for claiming the Winston No Bull 5 bonus. To fill out the top three, Jeff Gordon and Terry Labonte, both driving for Hendrick Motorsports, would finish second and third, respectively.

Background 

Talladega Superspeedway, originally known as Alabama International Motor Superspeedway (AIMS), is a motorsports complex located north of Talladega, Alabama. It is located on the former Anniston Air Force Base in the small city of Lincoln. The track is a tri-oval and was constructed in the 1960s by the International Speedway Corporation, a business controlled by the France family. Talladega is most known for its steep banking and the unique location of the start/finish line that's located just past the exit to pit road. The track currently hosts the NASCAR series such as the NASCAR Cup Series, Xfinity Series and the Camping World Truck Series. Talladega is the longest NASCAR oval with a length of 2.66-mile-long (4.28 km) tri-oval like the Daytona International Speedway, which also is a 2.5-mile-long (4 km) tri-oval.

Entry list 

 (R) denotes rookie driver.
 (W) denotes driver in the Winston No Bull 5.

Practice

First practice 
The first practice session was held on Friday, October 8, at 11:00 AM EST. The session would last for two hours and 30 minutes.

Final practice 
The final practice session, sometimes referred to as Happy Hour, was held on Saturday, October 9, after the preliminary 1998 Winn Dixie ARCA 300. The session would last for one hour.

Qualifying 
Qualifying was split into two rounds. The first round was held on Friday, October 8, at 3:30 PM EST. Each driver would have one lap to set a time. During the first round, the top 25 drivers in the round would be guaranteed a starting spot in the race. If a driver was not able to guarantee a spot in the first round, they had the option to scrub their time from the first round and try and run a faster lap time in a second round qualifying run, held on Saturday, October 9, at 10:45 AM EST. As with the first round, each driver would have one lap to set a time. On January 24, 1998, NASCAR would announce that the amount of provisionals given would be increased from last season. Positions 26-36 would be decided on time, while positions 37-43 would be based on provisionals. Six spots are awarded by the use of provisionals based on owner's points. The seventh is awarded to a past champion who has not otherwise qualified for the race. If no past champion needs the provisional, the next team in the owner points will be awarded a provisional.

Six drivers would fail to qualify: Dan Pardus, Rick Mast, Rick Wilson, Rich Bickle, Bobby Gerhart, and Gary Bradberry.

Full qualifying results

Race results

References 

1998 NASCAR Winston Cup Series
NASCAR races at Talladega Superspeedway
October 1998 sports events in the United States
1998 in sports in Alabama